Kimball City Hall is the seat of local government for Kimball, Minnesota, United States.  It was built in 1908 when the community was still a village known as Kimball Prairie.  When it first opened the hall housed offices for local government, professionals, and the telephone utility, as well as a public library and a municipal theater.  The building was listed on the National Register of Historic Places in 1982 as Kimball Prairie Village Hall for its local significance in the theme of politics/government.  It was nominated for embodying the importance the community placed on local government and public services in the early 20th century.

It was designed by architect Louis Lockwood.

See also
 List of city and town halls in the United States
 National Register of Historic Places listings in Stearns County, Minnesota

References

1908 establishments in Minnesota
City and town halls in Minnesota
City and town halls on the National Register of Historic Places in Minnesota
Buildings and structures in Stearns County, Minnesota
Government buildings completed in 1908
National Register of Historic Places in Stearns County, Minnesota